Larry W. Potts (born September 14, 1948) is an American politician. He was elected to the North Carolina House of Representatives in 2016. A Republican, he serves the 81st district.

Career
Potts previously served on the board of Davidson County Social Services. He also previously served as Chairman of the NC Social Services Commission prior to taking his seat in the NC General Assembly. 

In 2018 he was appointed by the Speaker of the House as Chairman of the Health Committee, DHHS Appropriations Committee, and Vice-Chairman of the House Appropriations Committee. In 2022 the Speaker of the House appointed Rep Potts Senior Chair of the House Health Committee and Chair of the House Appropriations Committee for HHS. Prior to being elected to the NC General Assembly he served almost 21 years as a Davidson County Commissioner-serving 9 terms as Chairman.  

Rep. Potts has served on the Executive Board of Directors for WFBH-Lexington Medical Center as well as 24 years on the Davidson County Economic Development Commission, and positions on various other boards and commissions. In January 2020 Rep. Potts received the Legislator of the Year Award from the National MS Society.

Electoral history

2020

2018

2016

References

Living people
Republican Party members of the North Carolina House of Representatives
1948 births
21st-century American politicians
People from Lexington, North Carolina